Lagenandra dewitii is a plant species belonging to the aroid genus Lagenandra. It was first described in 1986 from living plants and dried herbarium material and named in honour of the Dutch botanist Hendrik de Wit.

Distribution 
Sri Lanka

References

External links 
  Isotype in Kew Herbarium
 Isotype in Herbarium Berolinense

Plants described in 1986
Flora of Sri Lanka
dewitii